Ebrahim Suleman Maka (5 March 1922 – 7 November 1994) was a wicket-keeper who represented India in Test cricket. He was born in Daman, at the time part of Portuguese India.

Maka appeared at a time when the Indian cricket had many wicket-keepers of nearly the same class. His first appearance was in the fourth Test against Pakistan in 1952–53. The selectors had already tried out Probir Sen, Nana Joshi and Vijay Rajindernath as wicket-keepers in the previous Tests and Maka himself was replaced for the fifth Test.

His other Test was in West Indies in the same season when he was understudy to Joshi. While batting he had two bones of his right hand broken by fast bowler Frank King. Vijay Manjrekar substituted for him and effected a stumping.

Maka came from a poor family. His father was a cargo ship captain who earned Rs.150 a month and had to take care of a family of ten which lived near Crawford Market in Bombay.

References
  Richard Cashman, Patrons, Players and the Crowd (1979), p. 93

External links
 
 "Ebrahim Maka: Stumper whose batting held him back"

1922 births
1994 deaths
India Test cricketers
Indian cricketers
Mumbai cricketers
Muslims cricketers
Gujarat cricketers
West Zone cricketers
Associated Cement Company cricketers
Gujarati people
People from Daman district, India
Wicket-keepers